is a Japanese manga series written and illustrated by Nonki Miyasu. It was published in the Shueisha seinen magazine Weekly Young Jump with the chapters bound into four volumes between September 1995 and October 1997. It was adapted into two 1997 live-action films and an anime original video animation (OVA). The OVA was released on DVD by Media Blasters in the United States on December 19, 2000.

Reception
Chris Beveridge of Mania.com gave the OVA episode a mixed review. He noted the one episode might have been better as a compilation of similarly length anime from Media Blasters, though the inclusion of the dubbing extras somewhat made up for that. For the show itself he noted it may appeal to those who don't want hentai, but do want a high level of fan service stating, "What does Kocho have going for it? [...] There's plenty of fan service and nakedness throughout that will satisfy those who aren't brave enough to just buy hentai[,] but just feel wrong looking at the Rayearth girls in that way."

References

External links 
 

1995 manga
1997 anime OVAs
1997 films
Shueisha franchises
Shueisha manga
Seinen manga